Jérémie Zimmermann (born 1978) is a French computer science engineer co-founder of the Paris-based La Quadrature du Net, a citizen advocacy group defending fundamental freedoms online and co-founder of Hacking With Care, a "collective composed of hackers-activists, caregivers, artists, sociologist,  growing quite literally by contact and affinity".

Life

He appeared with Julian Assange on Episode 8 and Episode 9 of The World Tomorrow, "Cypherpunks: 1/2".

He is a contributor to Julian Assange's 2012 book Cypherpunks: Freedom and the Future of the Internet along with Jacob Appelbaum and Andy Müller-Maguhn (OR Books).

Awards
He was awarded the 2012 EFF Pioneer Award, together with other persons and groups.

References

External links

 ;  on the Fediverse
 
 Hacking With Care
 Wiki of Hacking With Care
 Talk about Hacking with Care - „Tactical and ethical care for all“ at Chaos Computer Club Berlin (Video)

1978 births
Living people
French computer scientists
French activists